KAXX may be:

 KVNT - (1020 AM) is an American commercial radio station in Eagle River, Alaska
 KAXX-LD - A television station in San Antonio, Texas
 Angel Fire Airport in Angel Fire, New Mexico